William Patterson "Pat" Skipper (born September 23, 1958) is an American television actor, film actor and voice actor. Pat is probably best known for his television work on such shows as The X-Files and Boston Legal. On film, he played Carducci in the (1996) action/horror film Hellraiser IV: Bloodline, Mason Strode from Halloween, Seabiscuit's Vet from Seabiscuit (2003), Bob from Fits and Starts, and Agent Ellroy from Chain of Command. He also wrote a book called "The Working Actor" in 2015.

Skipper was born in Lakeland, Florida. He was educated at Florida State University and Yale University.  He is married to composer/arranger Jennifer Hammond.  Their twins, Jack and Amelia, were born in 2002.

Filmography
Wall Street (1987) - Postal Inspector
Demonstone (1989) - Tony McKee
Lethal Weapon 2 (1989) - Hitman
Predator 2 (1990) - Federal Team #2
Memoirs of an Invisible Man (1992) - Morrissey
Demolition Man (1993) - Helicopter Pilot
Hellraiser IV: Bloodline (1996) - Carducci
Independence Day (1996) - Redneck
The Pest (1997) - Glen Livitt
The X Files (1997) - Bill Scully Jr.
That '70s Show (1999) - Marty Forman
Chain of Command (2000) - Agent Ellroy
In the Light of the Moon (2000) - Sheriff Jim Stillwell
Fits and Starts (2002) - Bob
Seabiscuit (2003) - Seabiscuit's Vet
See Arnold Run (2005) - Mike Murphy
Bones (2006) - Vince McVicar
Criminal Minds (2007) - Harris Townsend
Halloween (2007) - Mason Strode
American Summer (2009) - Frank
Babylon (2022) - William Randolph Hearst

Video games
Cube Blue (2000)(VG) -Homer Farrow
Emergency Room 2 (1999)(VG) -

References

External links

1958 births
American male film actors
American male television actors
American male voice actors
Living people